Yeşilöz may refer to the following places in Turkey:

 Yeşilöz, Alanya, a beach resort village (yayla) in the district of Alanya, Antalya Province
 Yeşilöz, Amasya, a village in the district of Amasya, Amasya Province
 Yeşilöz, Batman, a village in the district of Batman, Batman Province
 Yeşilöz, Çerkeş
 Yeşilöz, Güdül, a town in the district of Güdül, Ankara Province
 Yeşilöz, Gülşehir, a village in the district of Gülşehir, Nevşehir Province
 Yeşilöz, Horasan
 Yeşilöz, İnebolu, a village
 Yeşilöz, Kalecik, a village in the district of Kalecik, Ankara Province
 Yeşilöz, Köprüköy
 Yeşilöz, Kurşunlu
 Yeşilöz, Polatlı, a village in the district of Polatlı, Ankara Province